Cycling competitions at the 2021 Junior Pan American Games in Cali, Colombia, were held from 26 November to 3 December 2021.

20 medal events were contested in four cycling disciplines: track (12), road (4), BMX Racing (2) and Mountain Biking (2).

Medal table

Medalists

Road cycling

Track cycling

Mountain biking

BMX racing

References

External links
Road cycling at the 2021 Junior Pan American Games
Track cycling at the 2021 Junior Pan American Games
Mountain biking at the 2021 Junior Pan American Games
BMX racing at the 2021 Junior Pan American Games

Junior Pan American Games
Events at the 2021 Junior Pan American Games
Qualification tournaments for the 2023 Pan American Games